Croydon Central is a constituency created in 1974 and is represented in the House of Commons of the UK Parliament since 2017 by Labour MP Sarah Jones. The seat bucked the trend in national results in 2019, with Labour holding the seat with a slightly increased majority.

Constituency profile 
Croydon Central covers a wedge of the London Borough of Croydon to the east of central Croydon and is much more marginal than the other selected two parliamentary divisions constrained to the borough itself; Croydon South (which is safely Conservative) and Croydon North (which is safely Labour).

The northern parts are characterised by terraced houses and urban areas, with small council estates. Labour gains much support from in particular Addiscombe, Fieldway, Woodside and Ashburton. The southern area, largely Conservative, consists of suburban semi-detached houses, populated by commuters, surrounded by golf courses and parkland. The wards of Shirley, Heathfield and Fairfield give large Conservative votes.

In the south-east corner is a large former council estate, New Addington; home to more than 10,000 people. The estate is largely White and has comprised the whole or vast bulk of one or two wards of the United Kingdom in its history.

The New Addington wards saw one of the highest turnouts of British National Party supporters during the 2002 and 2006 council elections, which the BNP described as their "heyday decade," however it never elected a local councillor from the party – its slate of councillors has been consistently from the Labour Party. Except on one occasion in 2010, where a Conservative councillor was elected for the first time since 1968. Historically, Labour's strength in the area had been on the council estates, particularly New Addington, but in 2014, Labour support was reduced by UKIP, gauging 24% of the overall vote.

The two major-stop railway stations on the national network, most office buildings, businesses and shopping centres of Croydon are within the constituency. A wide range of flats forms a major part of the housing sector unlike neighbouring seats, from upmarket expensively-built apartments with dedicated gym and restaurant facilities to 
ex-local authority brutalist architecture tower blocks, most of which had been replaced by the 2010s.

Political history 
The constituency that preceded Croydon Central, Croydon South (1918–1950) and (1955–1974) had the modern borough area's two periods of brief Labour Party parliamentary representation — David Rees-Williams held the forerunner from the 1945 Labour landslide until unfavourable boundary changes in 1950. David Winnick was MP 1966–1970. Otherwise, the area at parliamentary level has elected, since 1918, Conservative MPs.

In 1997, Croydon's seats were reduced from four to three and the displaced Conservative members had to face one another for the right to stand in the new Croydon Central seat (Croydon North by then a Labour-held seat). The MP for Croydon North East, David Congdon was chosen over Sir Paul Beresford, the MP for the former Croydon Central seat. However, three years after Labour had taken control of Croydon Council, Labour's Geraint Davies saw off Congdon with a majority of 4,000 votes. He retained the seat with a similar majority in 2001, but lost by just 75 votes to Conservative Andrew Pelling in 2005, with the Liberal Democrats and Green Party gaining a local record of 7,000 votes between them.

The 2015 general election result, gave the seat the third-most marginal majority of the Conservative Party's 331 seats by percentage of majority. In 2017, Labour's Sarah Jones gained the seat with a majority of 5,652 votes, the largest in the seat for any party since 1992. 
Croydon Central is one of five constituencies, the others being Enfield Southgate, Leeds North West, Peterborough and Reading East; which elected Labour MPs in 2017 having not done so since 2001.

Boundaries 

Croydon Central covers the central and eastern parts of the London Borough of Croydon, one of the Borough's three seats. It is bordered by Croydon North and Croydon South, as well as Beckenham to the east.

The seat was redrawn in the 1997 redistribution, taking in territory from most of the pre-1997 Croydon Central constituency (losing Waddon ward to the redrawn Croydon South) and part of the abolished Croydon North East constituency. It covers an area that was Croydon South constituency until 1974 when part of Surrey East was incorporated into a new Croydon South constituency, following the creation of the London Borough of Croydon in 1965.

Members of Parliament

Election results

Elections in the 2010s

Elections in the 2000s

Elections in the 1990s

Elections in the 1980s

Elections in the 1970s

See also 
List of parliamentary constituencies in London

Notes

References

External links 
Politics Resources (Election results from 1922 onwards)
Electoral Calculus (Election results from 1955 onwards)

Parliamentary constituencies in London
Politics of the London Borough of Croydon
Constituencies of the Parliament of the United Kingdom established in 1974